Ellie Parker is a 2005 American comedy-drama film written and directed by Scott Coffey. It stars Naomi Watts in the title role, a young woman struggling as an actress in Los Angeles. Ellie Parker began as a short film that was screened at the 2001 Sundance Film Festival. Using a handheld digital camera, writer-director Scott Coffey expanded it into a feature-length film at various times over the next four years. It was finally released in 2005.

Plot
Ellie Parker is the story of an Australian actress struggling to make it in Hollywood. Ellie is young enough to still go to auditions back and forth across Los Angeles, changing wardrobes and slapping on makeup en route, but just old enough that the future feels "more like a threat than a promise". She lives with her vacuous musician boyfriend (Mark Pellegrino), who leaves her just about as dissatisfied as any other part of her life, and has a loose definition of the word "fidelity". Helping make sense of their surreal and humiliating Hollywood existence is her best friend Sam (Rebecca Rigg), another out-of-work actress trying her hand at design, who attends acting classes with Ellie to stay sharp. When Ellie gets into a fender bender with a guy who claims he is a cinematographer (Scott Coffey), her perspective on her work and the dating world starts to change. Chevy Chase also makes an appearance playing Ellie's agent.

Cast
 Naomi Watts as Ellie Parker
 Rebecca Rigg as Sam
 Scott Coffey as Chris
 Mark Pellegrino as Justin
 Chevy Chase as Dennis Swartzbaum
 Jennifer Syme as Casting Chick
 Jessicka as Acting Class Student
 Keanu Reeves as Dogstar bassist (himself)

Production
Watts, Coffey, and Pellegrino all worked together on David Lynch's Mulholland Drive, where Watts had her breakout performance, and Ellie Parker grew out of the friendship forged between Watts and director and screenwriter Coffey. It was shot on digital video over the course of five years, having begun its life as a series of shorts featuring Watts' character.

The film centers on a quote from the prologue to William Shakespeare's Henry V:
O for a Muse of fire, that would ascend
The brightest heaven of invention,
A kingdom for a stage, princes to act
And monarchs to behold the swelling scene!

References

External links
 
 
 Ellie Parker trailer

2005 films
2005 comedy-drama films
2005 independent films
2000s satirical films
American comedy-drama films
American independent films
American satirical films
Features based on short films
Films about actors
Films about Hollywood, Los Angeles
Films directed by Scott Coffey
Films set in Los Angeles
Films shot in Los Angeles
2005 directorial debut films
2000s English-language films
2000s American films